Creighton University is a private Jesuit research university in Omaha, Nebraska. Founded by the Society of Jesus in 1878, the university is accredited by the Higher Learning Commission. In 2015 the university enrolled 8,393 graduate and undergraduate students on a  campus just outside Omaha's downtown business district. It is classified among "R2: Doctoral Universities – High research activity".

History 
The university was founded as Creighton College on September 2, 1878, through a gift from Mary Lucretia Creighton, who stipulated in her will that a school be established in memory of her husband, prominent Omaha businessman Edward Creighton. Edward's brother, John A. Creighton, is credited with fostering and sustaining the university's early growth and endowment. In 1958, the college split into Creighton Preparatory Schools and the present-day Creighton University.

Academics 

The schools and colleges at Creighton are:
 College of Arts & Sciences
 Heider College of Business (formerly known as the College of Business Administration)
 College of Nursing
 School of Dentistry
 School of Medicine
 School of Pharmacy & Health Professions
 School of Law
 Graduate School
 College of Professional Studies

The College of Arts & Sciences is the largest school, containing about 28% of the university's enrolled students.  Creighton's acceptance rate is 72.7%.

In 2018, the university announced a Phoenix Health Sciences Campus, which opened in 2021.

Athletics 

Creighton competes in NCAA Division I athletics as a member of the Big East. Nicknamed the Bluejays, Creighton fields 14 teams in eight sports.

Notable basketball players at the university include Paul Silas, Benoit Benjamin, Kyle Korver, and current coach Greg McDermott's son Doug McDermott, while famous former Bluejays coaches include Eddie Sutton, Willis Reed, and Dana Altman.

The women's basketball team won the WNIT championship in 2004. It plays all home games on campus at D. J. Sokol Arena.

The men's soccer team maintained 17 straight NCAA tournament appearances between 1992 and 2008. During that time, the Bluejays made three College Cup appearances, including one championship game appearance (2000). It plays all home games on campus at Morrison Stadium.

Creighton's baseball team has one appearance in the College World Series (1991). Jim Hendry, the former general manager of the Chicago Cubs, was Creighton's head coach for its 1991 CWS appearance. The program's graduates include Hall of Fame pitcher Bob Gibson.

The women's softball team has had two appearances in the Women's College World Series (1982 and 1986) and has appeared in six of the past eight NCAA Tournaments. Tara Oltman (2007–2010), the best pitcher in MVC history, was a three-time league Pitcher of the Year and finished her career with conference records for wins, innings pitched, starts, appearances, strikeouts, and complete games. She remains the only student-athlete in Bluejays history to earn first-team all-conference honors in four consecutive seasons.

Demographics 

, Creighton's enrollment was 8,435, of whom 4,163 were undergraduates. From Creighton's Class of 2020, 14% count themselves as first-generation college attendees in their families. 26% are students of color, and 56% of the class is female; 82% of the class have taken part in volunteer service.

Student clubs and organizations 
The university has more than 200 student organizations:

Residence halls 
There are currently eight residence halls: Davis Square, Deglman Hall, Heider Hall, Kenefick Hall, Kiewit Hall, McGloin Hall, Opus Hall and Swanson Hall. They are all co-educational. A ninth, Graves Hall, is currently under construction (as of January 2023) on 23rd Street, south of Burt Street. Expected to be completed in August 2023, it will be able to accommodate 400 first-year students. It is Creighton's first new residence hall since 2006, and the first built exclusively for first-year students since the 1960s.

Academic honor societies 
 Phi Beta Kappa – National Honor Society
 Alpha Sigma Nu – Jesuit Honor society
 Sigma Pi Sigma – Physics
 Psi Chi – Psychology
 Phi Sigma – Biology
 Theta Alpha Kappa – National Honor Society
 Phi Sigma Tau – Philosophy
 Pi Sigma Alpha – Political Science
 Sigma Tau Delta – English
 Beta Alpha Psi – Accounting
 Eta Sigma Phi – Classics
 Alpha Psi Omega – Theatre
 Sigma Theta Tau - Nursing

Student government 
 Creighton Students Union (CSU) is Creighton University's comprehensive student government, consisting of students from each of Creighton University's schools and colleges. CSU has served as the student body's official voice to faculty, staff, and the outside community since 1922. CSU also devotes significant resources to other student organizations, including a large part of its budget dedicated to funding student organizations; its former name was Student Board of Governors.
 Each school has its own student advising body for academic affairs.
Inter Residence Hall Government (IRHG) was formed in 1984 by Steven Conroy and serves as the voice for all students who live on Creighton's campus. IRHG represents all of Creighton's residence halls and sponsors programs and legislative actions.

John P. Schlegel, S.J. Center for Service and Justice 

The John P. Schlegel, S.J. Center for Service and Justice  (SCSJ) promotes weekly local community service projects, Fall and Spring Break service trips, student leadership development, and education about contemporary justice issues. The center helped develop the Cortina Community, a sophomore intentional-living community named for Jesuit priest Jon de Cortina.

Performing arts 
 Several vocal groups exist. The Department of Fine and Performing Arts, within the College of Arts and Sciences, houses a Chamber Choir (selective), Gospel Choir, Jazz Ensemble, Wind Ensemble, Orchestra, and University Chorus. The men's a cappella ensemble is known as the Creightones.
 The Creighton Dance Company's eclectic repertoire draws on classical ballet, contemporary and modern dance, jazz and musical theatre dance.
 The Department of Fine and Performing Arts offers undergraduate degrees in Art History, Studio Art, Dance, Music, Theatre, and Musical Theatre.
 Several theatrical productions are held each year in the university's Lied Education Center for the Arts.

Student media 
 The student newspaper The Creightonian, first published in 1924, is published every Thursday during the school year. In 2007 and 2008, The Creightonian was named Nebraska's top college newspaper in the Nebraska Press Association contest. Staff members won numerous individual awards. The Creightonian was a finalist for the 2007 and 2010 Pacemaker Award, one of the top awards in college journalism.
 Creighton's literature and arts publication Shadows has received a 2007 Silver Crown award from the Columbia Scholastic Press Association (CSPA). The journal is published twice a year. The magazine's editorial office is the oldest student organization on campus.

Clubs 
Many organizations allow students to share their common interests. Examples include:
 Cultural – Hui O Hawaii, International Student Association, Spanish Club
 Greek – Fraternities: Beta Theta Pi, Phi Delta Theta, Sigma Alpha Epsilon, Sigma Phi Epsilon, Delta Chi. Sororities: Alpha Phi, Delta Delta Delta, Delta Zeta, Gamma Phi Beta, Kappa Kappa Gamma, Pi Beta Phi, Theta Phi Alpha.
 Political – NAACP College Chapter, College Republicans, College Democrats, Turning Point USA
 Professional – Premedical Society, Predental Society, Fellowship of Christian Law Students, Academy of Student Pharmacists, Business Law Society, International Relations Club
 Religious – Canisius Society, Inter Varsity Christian Fellowship, Muslim Student Organization, Rosary Club, the Navigators (formerly Jays for Christ), Knights of Columbus, Student Jewish Organization
 Service – Alpha Phi Omega, Colleges Against Cancer, Habitat for Humanity, Best Buddies of America, Circle K International

Notable alumni

There are more than 68,470 living alumni of Creighton University in 93 countries. Nearly 30 percent live in Nebraska. The largest number of alumni outside the United States reside in Canada, Japan, and Malaysia.

Alumni include Marcia Anderson, the first African-American woman to attain the rank of major general in the United States Army Reserve; Michael P. Anderson, an astronaut killed in the Space Shuttle Columbia disaster; Donald Keough, once president and chief operating officer of Coca-Cola; Joe Ricketts, the founder of TD Ameritrade and owner of the Chicago Cubs; Mark Walter, founder and chief executive officer of Guggenheim Partners, and part owner of the Los Angeles Dodgers, Symone Sanders, Democratic strategist and spokesperson for Bernie Sanders' 2016 presidential campaign; Mike Johanns, former Governor of Nebraska, former United States Senator, and former United States Secretary of Agriculture; Cathy Hughes, first African American woman to head a publicly traded corporation (Urban One) and currently second wealthiest African American woman; J. Clay Smith Jr., former interim head of the Equal Employment Opportunity Commission, and former dean of Howard University School of Law; novelists Ron Hansen and Theodore Wheeler; and several professional athletes, including Major League Baseball Hall of Fame pitcher Bob Gibson and professional basketball players Kyle Korver, Anthony Tolliver, and Doug McDermott.

Notable faculty

Raymond J. Bishop
Virgil Blum
Patrick Borchers
Raymond A. Bucko
Judith M. Burnfield
John Calvert
Edward P. J. Corbett
Frank Crawford
Blase J. Cupich
Ross Horning
Henry T. Lynch
D. S. Malik
Francis I. McKenna
R. R. Reno
Joseph F. Rigge
William J. Riley
Robert F. Rossiter Jr.
Roger Lawrence Schwietz
Hugh Sidey
Constantine Joseph Smyth
William O. Stephens
Lyle Elmer Strom
LaNada War Jack

See also

 Education in North Omaha, Nebraska
 List of Jesuit sites
 Saint Joseph Hospital at Creighton University Medical Center

Notes

References

External links

 
 Official athletics website

 
Jesuit universities and colleges in the United States
Educational institutions established in 1878
Landmarks in North Omaha, Nebraska
Buildings and structures in Omaha, Nebraska
Education in Omaha, Nebraska
Catholic universities and colleges in Nebraska
Association of Catholic Colleges and Universities
Roman Catholic Archdiocese of Omaha
Creighton family
1878 establishments in Nebraska